DVD-R DS (DS stand for Double Side) is also called DVD-10 (Dual Side, Single Layer) or DVD-18 (Dual Side, Dual Layer), it is a sub category of DVD-R. A DVD-R DS has a storage capacity of 8.75 GB (DVD-10) or 15.9 GB (DVD-18).

See also 
 DVD
 DVD-R
 MultiLevel Recording
 List of optical disc manufacturers

References

DVD